William George Reed (25 January 1928 – January 2003) was a Welsh professional footballer who made nearly 300 appearances in the Football League and represented his country at schoolboy, amateur and senior level.

Reed played twice for the Wales amateur team while still a teenager. He turned professional with Cardiff City in 1947, but did not make his Football League debut until the following year with Brighton & Hove Albion. After five years and 132 appearances in all competitions, Reed signed for Ipswich Town. In four-and-a-half seasons with Ipswich, he scored 46 goals from 169 matches, won Third Division South titles in 1953–54 and 1956–57, and became the first Ipswich player to be capped for his country at senior level when he played twice for Wales in 1954. After a short spell with Swansea Town, he finished his career in non-league football.

Club career
William George Reed was born in Ynyshir, in Rhondda, Wales, on 25 January 1928. He represented Wales at schoolboy level, and played for the Wattstown Boys' Club before moving into senior football with Rhondda Transport. In 1947, he played twice for the Wales amateur team before turning professional with Football League Second Division club Cardiff City later that year. He never broke through to their first team, and signed for Brighton & Hove Albion of the Third Division South ahead of the 1948–49 season. By this time he was playing as an outside right rather than the inside-forward position of his early career. He made his Football League debut on Christmas Day 1948, filling in for Micky Kavanagh for the 1–1 draw away to Exeter City, and played in seven more matches that season, at outside left as well as outside right. He appeared in around half of Brighton's matches over the next two seasons, but was ever-present in 1951–52, becoming the team's joint top scorer (alongside Ken Bennett) with 19 goals as Albion finished in fifth place. Reed's relationship with the club was not a comfortable one, and he made several transfer requests before eventually moving to another Southern Section club, Ipswich Town, in July 1953 for a fee of £1750.

In his first season, Reed scored 13 league goals and earned himself a big reputation, to the extent that Charles Buchan, writing in the News Chronicle, opined that his absence from three of the last six fixtures with a freak injurya strain caused when he crossed his legs while seated in a chairwould likely deprive his team of their lead in the table. It did not, and Ipswich won the Third Division South title. He became the first Ipswich Town to be capped at senior international level when he played for Wales against Yugoslavia in September 1954. Reed's league goal tally dropped to six as Ipswich were relegated straight back to the Third Division. In September 1955, he scored a second-half hat-trick and set up a goal for a team-mate to help his side beat Walsall 5–2, and finished with 12 goals from 30 league matches, but the season was marred by knee problems, culminating in a cartilage operation.

He missed a month early in the following season with a pulled thigh muscle, but played regularly once fit, and contributed ten goals to Ipswich's second Southern Section title. With moments left of that season's FA Cup third round tie at home to Fulham, Ipswich were losing 3–2 when they "launched an attack which ended with Billy Reed crashing the ball into the visitors' net", fractionally after the referee's final whistle. When the visiting supporters realised the goal did not stand, they laid siege to the referee's dressing room, but he had already left the ground on police advice. Reed played little in the 1957–58 Second Division season, and in February 1958 he signed for Swansea Town for a £3,000 fee. He made eight first-team appearances in what remained of the season, was restricted to the reserves during the next, and was transfer-listed by Swansea in April 1959.

Reed signed for Southern League club Worcester City, where he played alongside two other former international footballers, Roy Paul of Wales and Johnny Nicholls of England. The following January, he returned to Wales with Abergavenny Thursdays, with whom he won the Welsh League title and reached the semi-final of the 1959–60 Welsh Cup. He then signed for divisional rivals Caerau Athletic, for whom he played until at least December 1961, and also played for Milford United and Ferndale Athletic.

International career
Reed represented Wales at schoolboy level, and in January 1947, was selected at inside right for the Wales amateur team to face England at Dulwich. The Western Mail correspondent thought he had "a big future in front of him as an inside forward". He celebrated his 19th birthday with a goal as Wales came back from 2–0 down to draw the match 2–2, the first time for 18 years that the country had avoided defeat by England in an amateur international. His second appearance at that level came in March in a 4–1 loss to England at Newport.

In September 1954, Reed was selected to play for Wales against Yugoslavia. The first man capped at senior international level while an Ipswich Town player, he was reported to have had a good second half, but spent the night in a Cardiff hospital suffering from concussion. He retained his place for Wales' Home International against Scotland at Cardiff City's Ninian Park ground in October. The Sunday Mirror reporter speculated that the injury sustained by Reeda suspected broken noseupset the Welsh attack, though the team's preference for dribbling rather than passing and the failure to switch John Charles from centre half to centre forward soon enough were more likely explanations for Wales' 1–0 defeat.

Later life
Reed worked for a chemicals company and as a local government officer, as well as coaching in youth football and scouting for Wales national team manager Dave Bowen. He died in Swansea in January 2003.

Career statistics

References

External links
Profile at Pride of Anglia

1928 births
2003 deaths
People from Rhondda
Welsh footballers
Wales schools international footballers
Wales amateur international footballers
Wales international footballers
Association football wingers
Cardiff City F.C. players
Brighton & Hove Albion F.C. players
Ipswich Town F.C. players
Swansea City A.F.C. players
Worcester City F.C. players
Abergavenny Thursdays F.C. players
Milford United F.C. players
English Football League players
Southern Football League players
Ferndale Athletic F.C. players